Rujevac is a village in central Croatia, in the municipality of Dvor, Sisak-Moslavina County. It is connected by the D6 highway.

Demographics
According to the 2011 census, the village of Rujevac has 254 inhabitants. This represents 43.35% of its pre-war population according to the 1991 census.

The 1991 census recorded that 92.32% of the village population were ethnic Serbs (541/586), 5.12% were Yugoslavs (30/586), 1.19% were ethnic Croats (7/586), while 1.37% were of other ethnic origin (8/586)

NOTE: Figures for years of 1869 and 1880 also include population of Trgovi

Religion

Serbian Orthodox Church of the Transfiguration of the Lord
Serbian Orthodox Church of the Transfiguration of the Lord in Rujevac was completed in 1887 in historicist style. Church's iconostasis was completed in 1896 by Ivan Hochetlinger. Some of its icons were destroyed in 1941 when a Roman Catholic priest Osvald Tot who was involved with Ustashe government took them away under the claim that they need to be restored and adapted for Catholic services. Missing icons were painted by Dimitrije Joka in 1971 when the church was reconstructed.

Sights and events
 Orthodox Church built in the late 19th century
 Celebration of the Feast of Transfiguration on 19 August

Notable natives and residents

References

Populated places in Sisak-Moslavina County
Serb communities in Croatia